The Association for Liberal Thinking is a Turkish classical liberal, non-profit, non-governmental organization. ALT does not involve in daily politics and have no direct links with any political party or movement.

History
The group was informally founded on 26 December 1992 by liberal intellectuals and gained official status as an association under Turkish law on 1 April 1994. Three years after its informal formation the Association started to publish what it recognizes as its main publication, the journal titled Liberal Düşünce (Liberal Thought).

Organisation
The association is based in Ankara, the capital city of Turkey.

It has five working groups called "research centers": Din ve Hurriyet Araştırmaları Merkezi (Religion and Freedom Research Center), İnsan Hakları Merkezi (Human Rights Center), Ekonomik Özgürlük Merkezi (Economic Freedom Center), Çevre Politikaları Araştırma Merkezi (Environmental Policies Research Center) and Eğitim Politikaları Araştırma Merkezi (Education Policies Research Center).

Activities
The association publishes reports, books and journal (Liberal Düşünce, published quarterly), hosts seminars and runs educational programs. It supports research and carries out studies that serve understanding the Turkish society. It also organizes essay contest aimed primarily at university students for encouraging the study and dissemination of liberal thought. For example, the 2008 essay contest was on the meaning of reading Frederic Bastiat's Law.

Quarterly journal Liberal Düşünce (Liberal Thinking) is prestigious source for Turkish Liberal ideology and civil society. President of the Association  Atilla Yayla is also columnist in the liberal-conservative newspaper Yeni Şafak.

Projects carried out by the organisation have included 'Inter-religious Affairs: Search for A Peaceful Coexistence in a Secular and Democratic System', a 2004 project aimed at encouraging diversity which was sponsored by the European Commission.

The organisation is associated with Liberte Yayınları (Liberte Publications) that publishes its journals and books by its members.

The Association was a co-sponsor of the 2008 denialist International Conference on Climate Change, with the Heartland Institute as the main sponsor.

References

External links
 Official site in English

Think tanks based in Turkey
Classical liberalism
Conservatism in Turkey
Libertarian think tanks
Climate change denial